Christ Church and Manlius Village Cemeteries in Manlius, New York is a  designation on the National Register of Historic Places.

The listing includes two adjacent cemeteries and a stone wall.

The Christ Church Cemetery was founded on March 4, 1813, when Eleanor Mulholland and her grandson, Thomas Derbyshire, deeded 60 rods of land from lot 98 to the church.

References

External links

 
 

Churches on the National Register of Historic Places in New York (state)
Churches completed in 1809
19th-century churches in the United States
Cemeteries on the National Register of Historic Places in New York (state)
Churches in Onondaga County, New York
Cemeteries in Onondaga County, New York
Manlius, New York
National Register of Historic Places in Onondaga County, New York
1809 establishments in New York (state)